Gustavo Gaviria Angel  (born August 12, 1948;  Bogota, Colombia) is a Colombian coffee entrepreneur,  founder and President of Industrias Aliadas,  Coffeecol, Aurora and Chairman of Vision de Valores S.A.  He is best known for his contribution as special ambassador of Colombia to the Milan Expo 2010 and the Shangai Expo 2015.

Personal life
Gaviria studied industrial engineering from the University of Los Andes (Colombia). He holds a postgraduate degree in management from University of La Sabana also known as Inalde.

Career
Gaviria serves as an adviser of the International Finance Corporation.

Expo leadership
Gaviria served as Ambassador of Colombia in special mission and general commissioner to Expo 2010,  known officially as Expo 2010 Shanghai China.

Gaviria was member of Board of Directors of the Sustainable Food Pavilion at Expo 2015, a Universal Exposition hosted by Milan, Italy. In this capacity, he was responsible for introducing Colombia to the 3 million visitors of this event.

References 

1948 births
Living people
Colombian businesspeople
Colombian diplomats
University of Los Andes (Colombia) alumni
University of La Sabana alumni
People from Bogotá